The women's downhill mountain biking event at the 2010 UCI Mountain Bike & Trials World Championships in Mont Sainte-Anne took place on 5 September.

Results - Elite

Results - Juniors

See also
UCI Mountain Bike & Trials World Championships

References

 Official results

Downhill women
UCI